Dark Interlude is a 1947 spy thriller novel by the British writer Peter Cheyney. It features a British secret agent Shaun Aloysius O'Mara and his superior Quale, a recurring figure in Cheyney's novels.

Synopsis
O'Mara is sent to Paris to uncover information that will help track down the lone remaining member of the Nazi German espionage network still at large. While there he becomes entangled with fellow spy Tanga de Sarieux.

References

Bibliography
 Panek, LeRoy. The Special Branch: The British Spy Novel, 1890-1980. Popular Press, 1981.
 Reilly, John M. Twentieth Century Crime & Mystery Writers. Springer, 2015.

1947 British novels
Novels by Peter Cheyney
British thriller novels
British spy novels
Novels set in Paris
William Collins, Sons books